A teaspoon (tsp.) is an item of cutlery. It is a small spoon that can be used to stir a cup of tea or coffee, or as a tool for measuring volume.

Cutlery

A teaspoon is a small spoon suitable for stirring and sipping the contents of a cup of tea or coffee, or adding a portion of loose sugar to it. These spoons have heads more or less oval in shape. Teaspoons are a common part of a place setting.

Teaspoons with longer handles, such as iced tea spoons, are commonly used also for ice cream desserts or floats. Similar spoons include the tablespoon and the dessert spoon, the latter intermediate in size between a teaspoon and a tablespoon, used in eating dessert and sometimes soup or cereals. Much less common is the coffee spoon, which is a smaller version of the teaspoon, intended for use with the small type of coffee cup. Another teaspoon, called an orange spoon (in American English: grapefruit spoon), tapers to a sharp point or teeth, and is used to separate citrus fruits from their membranes. A bar spoon, equivalent to a teaspoon, is used in measuring ingredients for mixed drinks.

A container designed to hold extra teaspoons, called a spooner, usually in a set with a covered sugar container, formed a part of Victorian table service.

History 
Teaspoon is a European invention. Small spoons were common in Europe since at least the 13th century, the special spoons were introduced almost simultaneously with the tea and coffee (Pettigrew points to use in the mid-17th century). Originally the teaspoons were exotic items, precious and small, resembling the demitasse spoons of the later times. Also used for coffee, these spoons were usually made of gilt silver, and were available with a variety of handle shapes: plain, twisted, decorated with knobs, also known as knops, hence the knop-top name for such spoons. Widespread use and modern size date back to the Georgian era. 
The teaspoon is first mentioned in an advertisement in a 1686 edition of the London Gazette, teaspoons, probably of English origin, are present on the 1700 Dutch painting by Nicholas Verkolje, "A Tea Party".

A special dish for resting the teaspoons, a "spoon boat", was a part of the tea set in the 18th century. At that time, the spoons were playing important role in the tea drinking etiquette: a spoon laid "across" the teacup indicated that the guest did not need any more tea, otherwise, the hostess was obligated to offer a fresh cup of tea, and it was considered impolite to refuse the offering. Pettigrew reports that sometimes the spoons were numbered to make it easier to match the cups with the guests after a refill.

Unit of measure 

In some countries, a teaspoon (occasionally "teaspoonful") is a cooking measure of volume, especially widely used in cooking recipes and pharmaceutic medical prescriptions. In English it is abbreviated as tsp. or, less often, as t., ts., or tspn.. The abbreviation is never capitalized because a capital letter is customarily reserved for the larger tablespoon ("Tbsp.", "T.", "Tbls.", or "Tb.").

The household teaspoons provide very bad approximations of any unit of measure. In a small-scale research, Falagas et al. found out that the volume of liquids inside different teaspoons varies almost three times, between 2.5 and 7.3 ml (the average value was 4.4 ml).

Metric teaspoon

United States customary unit

As a unit of culinary measure, one teaspoon in the United States is  tablespoon, exactly , 1  US fluid drams,  US fl oz,  US cup,  US liquid gallon, or  (0.30078125) cubic inches.

For nutritional labeling and medicine in the US, the teaspoon is defined the same as a metric teaspoonprecisely 5 millilitres (mL).

Dry ingredients
For dry ingredients (e.g., salt, flour, spices), if a recipe calls for a level teaspoon, it refers to an approximately leveled filling of the spoon, producing the same volume as for liquids. A rounded teaspoon is a larger but less precise measure, produced by scooping a larger portion, then lightly tapping the spoon so that the loose ingredient falls away without leveling the ingredient off.* A heaping (North American English) or heaped (UK English) teaspoon is an even larger inexact measure consisting of the amount obtained by scooping the dry ingredient up as high as possible without leveling it off. For some ingredients, e.g. flour, this quantity can vary considerably.
 This is a clarification of the previous definition of "rounded" teaspoon, which was, in essence, identical to "heaping" teaspoon. Cite - my father's kitchen, my mother's kitchen, and my grandmother's kitchen, and my high school home economics class, all from which and whom I was taught.

Apothecary 

The apothecaries' teaspoon was formally known by the Latin cochleare minus (cochl. min.) to distinguish it from the tablespoon or cochleare majus (cochl. maj.).

When tea-drinking was first introduced to England circa 1660, tea was rare and expensive, as a consequence of which teacups and teaspoons were smaller than today. This situation persisted until 1784, when the Commutation Act reduced the tax on tea from 119% to 12.5%. As the price of tea declined, the size of teacups and teaspoons increased. Nevertheless, the teaspoon, usually under its Latin name, continued to be used in apothecaries' measures for several more decades, with the original definition of one fluid dram.

See also
Bar spoon
Caddy spoon, a specialized spoon used for taking dried tea out of a storage container
Cooking weights and measures
Dessert spoon
Tablespoon

References

Sources

External links
UK National Health Service (NHS) Spoons give wrong medicine doses (Archived version of "retired" NHS page.)
US National Institutes of Health (NIH) MedlinePlus Liquid medication administration

Cooking weights and measures
Spoons
Spoon
Units of volume
Customary units of measurement in the United States
Imperial units
Metricated units
Alcohol measurement